Cobbler's Lock is a lock on the Kennet and Avon Canal, near Hungerford, Berkshire, England.

The lock has a rise/fall of 8 ft 3 in (2.51 m).

References

See also

Locks on the Kennet and Avon Canal

Locks of Berkshire
Locks on the Kennet and Avon Canal